Clearbrook  Human Service Agency is a non-profit organisation located in Arlington Heights, Illinois. It was originally established in 1955 in Rolling Meadows, Illinois with initial funding coming from families and Kimball Hill, (which is now one of the country's largest privately held land developers). Clearbrook lists its mission as "being a leader in creating innovative opportunities, services and supports to individuals with developmental disabilities".

It is one of the largest charities (as defined by operating budget) in Chicago. The agency is led by Carl M. La Mell, its president.

History 

Clearbrook began in 1955 in Rolling Meadows, Illinois when a group of parents began meeting with the goal of establishing a school for their developmentally disabled children. In 1956, the Rolling Meadows Community School for Retarded Children Council opened its doors in a rehabilitated barn. In 1961, a permanent facility was established.

In 1965, Clearbrook began the Clearbrook Vocational Rehabilitation Center to assist developmentally disabled individuals in job training.

In 1973, Clearbrook opened its first residential program for adults in Arlington Heights, IL. This marked a shift toward human services as public schools began to offer classes aimed towards the developmentally disabled.

Today Clearbrook runs over 40 facilities and performs a variety of functions that include group homes, resale shops, in-home programs and senior programs.

Accreditation 

The agency is an officially listed 501 (c)(3) with the U.S. Department of the Treasury. Clearbrook is accredited by the Commission on Accreditation of Rehabilitation Facilities (CARF); NISH; the Illinois Department of Human Services; the Illinois Department of Public Health; and the Illinois Office of Rehabilitation Services.

References

External links 

Winning Workplaces 2006 
ABC7 Chicago Story

Social care in the United States
Disability organizations based in the United States
Charities based in Illinois